Countdown is an album by organist Jimmy McGriff recorded in 1983 and released on the Milestone label.

Reception 

Allmusic's Scott Yanow said: "Few surprises occur, but the music is quite enjoyable and easily recommended to fans of this genre".

Track listing
 "I'm Walkin'" (Fats Domino, Dave Bartholomew) – 6:59	
 "Holly" (Jimmy McGriff) – 5:15
 "Down for the Count" (Frank Foster) – 4:07
 "Blow Your Horn" (Benny Green) – 4:08
 "Since I Fell for You" (Buddy Johnson) – 4:59
 "Shiny Stockings" (Foster) – 8:14

Personnel
Jimmy McGriff – organ
Clifford Adams Jr. – trombone
Marshall Keys – alto saxophone
Arnold Sterling - alto saxophone, tenor saxophone
Melvin Sparks – guitar
Vance James − drums

References

Milestone Records albums
Jimmy McGriff albums
1983 albums
Albums produced by Bob Porter (record producer)
Albums recorded at Van Gelder Studio